Glam metal (also known as hair metal or pop metal) is a subgenre of heavy metal that features pop-influenced hooks and guitar riffs, upbeat rock anthems, and slow power ballads. It borrows heavily from the fashion and image of 1970s glam rock.

Early glam metal evolved directly from the glam rock movement of the 1970s, as visual elements taken from acts such as T. Rex, the New York Dolls, and David Bowie (and to a lesser extent, the punk and new wave movements taking place concurrently in New York City) were fused with the decidedly more heavy metal leaning and theatrical acts such as Alice Cooper and Kiss. The first examples of this fusion began appearing in the late 1970s and early 1980s in the United States, particularly on the Los Angeles Sunset Strip music scene. Early glam metal bands include Mötley Crüe, Hanoi Rocks, Ratt, Quiet Riot, Twisted Sister, Bon Jovi, and Dokken. Glam metal achieved significant commercial success from approximately 1983 to 1992, bringing to prominence bands such as Poison, Skid Row, Cinderella and Warrant. From a strictly visual perspective, glam metal is defined by flashy and tight-fitting clothing, makeup, and an overall androgynous aesthetic in which the traditional "denim & leather" aspect of heavy metal culture is replaced by spandex, lace, and usually heavy use of bright colours.

Glam metal suffered a decline in popularity in the early-mid 1990s, as the grunge and alternative phenomena revolutionized hard rock, and fans' tastes moved toward a more natural and stripped-down aesthetic and a rejection of the glam metal visual style. During this period, many of the most successful acts of the genre's 1980s pinnacle suddenly found themselves facing disbandment as their audiences moved in another direction. Glam metal has experienced a resurgence since the late 1990s, with successful reunion tours of many popular acts from the genre's 1980s heyday, as well as the emergence of new, predominantly European bands, including the Darkness, Crashdiet, Reckless Love, and American band Steel Panther.

Characteristics, fashion, and terminology
Musically, glam metal combines a traditional heavy metal sound with elements of hard rock and punk rock, adding pop-influenced catchy hooks and guitar riffs. Like other heavy metal songs of the 1980s (most notably thrash metal songs), they often feature shred guitar solos. They also include extensive use of harmonies, particularly in the characteristic power balladsslow, emotional songs that gradually build to a strong finale. These were among the most commercially successful singles in the genre and opened it up to a wider audience that would otherwise not have been attracted to traditional heavy metal. Lyrical themes often deal with love and lust, with songs often directed at a particular woman.

Aesthetically glam metal draws heavily on the glam rock or glitter rock of the 1970s, often with very long backcombed hair, use of hair spray, use of make-up, gaudy clothing and accessories (chiefly consisting of tight denim or leather jeans, spandex, and headbands). The visual aspects of glam metal appealed to music television producers, particularly MTV, whose establishment coincided with the rise of the genre. Glam metal performers became infamous for their debauched lifestyles of drugs, strippers and late-night parties, which were widely covered in the tabloid press.

Sociologist Deena Weinstein points to the large number of terms used to describe more commercial forms of heavy metal, which she groups together as lite metal. These include, beside glam metal: melodic metal, false metal, poodle bands, nerf metal, pop metal or metal pop, the last of which was coined by critic Philip Bashe in 1983 to describe bands such as Van Halen and Def Leppard. AllMusic employs the umbrella term "pop metal", which refers to the whole pop-tinted hard rock and heavy metal scene of the 1980s (including Def Leppard, Bon Jovi, Europe), and locates hair metal as a late-1980s variation of pop metal characterized by flashy clothing and heavy makeup influenced by glam rock (as embodied by Poison and Mötley Crüe). Use of the derogatory term "hair metal" started in the early 1990s, as grunge gained popularity at the expense of 1980s metal. In the "definitive metal family tree" of his documentary Metal: A Headbanger's Journey, anthropologist Sam Dunn differentiates pop metal, which includes bands like Def Leppard, Europe, and Whitesnake, from glam metal bands such as Mötley Crüe and Poison.

History

Predecessors

Music journalist Stephen Davis claims the influences of the style can be traced back to acts like Kiss, Boston, Cheap Trick, and the New York Dolls. Kiss, and to a lesser extent Alice Cooper, were major influences on the genre. Finnish band Hanoi Rocks, heavily influenced themselves by the New York Dolls, have been credited with setting a blueprint for the look of hair metal.

Van Halen has been seen as highly influential on the movement, emerging in 1978 from the Los Angeles music scene on Sunset Strip, with a sound based around the lead guitar skills of Eddie Van Halen. He popularized a playing technique of two-handed hammer-ons and pull-offs called tapping, showcased on the song "Eruption" from the album Van Halen. This sound, and lead singer David Lee Roth's stage antics, would be highly influential on glam metal, although Van Halen would never fully adopt a glam aesthetic. Def Leppard, often categorized with the New Wave of British heavy metal, released their second album High 'n' Dry in 1981, mixing glam rock with heavy metal, and helping to define the sound of hard rock for the decade.

Mainstream success (1981–1991)

First wave (1981–1986)
In the early 1980s, bands from across the United States began to move towards what would become the glam metal sound. In 1981, Mötley Crüe (from Los Angeles) released their first album Too Fast for Love, Dokken (also from Los Angeles) released their first album Breaking the Chains, and Kix (from western Maryland) released their first album Kix. In 1982, Night Ranger (from San Francisco) released their initial album Dawn Patrol which reached the top 40 in the United States.

1983 was the breakout year for heavy metal: Quiet Riot's Metal Health was the first heavy metal album to reach number one in the Billboard charts. Quiet Riot success paved the way for many heavy metal acts, glam and otherwise, as the decade progressed. That same year saw a larger wave of heavy metal albums achieve previously unheard of commercial success, with Mötley Crüe releasing its second album Shout at the Devil, Def Leppard releasing its third album Pyromania, and Kiss releasing Lick It Up.

Def Leppard's Pyromania, later certified 10× platinum by the Recording Industry Association of America (RIAA), reached number two on the Billboard 200. The singles "Foolin'", "Photograph", and "Rock of Ages", helped by the emergence of MTV, reached the Top 40. Pyromanias style was widely emulated, particularly by the emerging Californian scene. However, remarked Leppard's Joe Elliott, "I don't know how anybody could confuse us with that lot. We weren't even around when all those so-called glam bands came up. We were in fuckin' Holland making Hysteria. While they were out banging chicks or whatever, we were looking at windmills and playing pool on a table without any pockets. We were as far away from LA as any band could be."

The most active glam metal scene was starting to appear in clubs on the Sunset Strip in Los Angeles, including The Trip, the Whisky a Go Go, and the Starwood. These clubs began to avoid booking punk rock bands because of fears of violence and began booking many metal bands, usually on a "pay to play" basis, thus creating a vibrant scene for hard rock music. An increasing number of metal bands were able to produce debut albums in 1984, including Ratt (from Los Angeles) with its breakthrough album Out of the Cellar, Bon Jovi (from New Jersey) with its debut Bon Jovi, Great White with Great White, Black 'n Blue (from Portland, Oregon) with Black 'n Blue, Autograph with its first album Sign In Please, and W.A.S.P. with its self-titled debut album.

All these bands played a part in developing the overall look and sound of glam metal during the early 1980s. In 1985, many more commercially successful glam metal albums began to appear. Mötley Crüe released Theatre of Pain, Ratt's second album Invasion of Your Privacy, Dokken's third album Under Lock and Key, Stryper's first release Soldiers Under Command, Bon Jovi's second release 7800° Fahrenheit, and Autograph's second album That's The Stuff. Los Angeles continued to foster the most important scene around the Sunset Strip, with groups like London, which had originally formed as a glam rock band in the 1970s, and had seen future members of Mötley Crüe, Cinderella and Guns N' Roses pass through its ranks, finally releasing their début album Non Stop Rock in 1985 as well.

Second wave (1986–1991)
By the mid-late 1980s, glam metal had begun to become a major mainstream success in America with many of these bands' music videos appearing on heavy rotation on MTV often at the top of MTV's daily dial countdown, and some of the bands appeared on the channel's shows such as Headbangers Ball, which became one of the most popular programs with over 1.3 million views a week. The groups also received heavy rotation on radio stations such as KNAC in Los Angeles.

1986 was a significant year for glam metal music as one of the most commercially significant releases of the era was put out by Bon Jovi with Slippery When Wet which mixed metal with a pop sensibility, and spent a total of eight weeks at the top of the Billboard 200 album chart, selling over 12 million copies in the United States. It became the first hard rock album to spawn three top ten singles, two of which reached number one. The album has been credited with widening the audience for the genre, particularly by appealing to women as well as the traditional male dominated audience, and opening the door to MTV and commercial success for other bands at the end of the decade.

The Swedish band Europe released the anthemic album The Final Countdown which reached the top ten in several countries, including the U.S. and while the title single reached number one in 26 countries. Stryper made their mainstream breakthrough in 1986 with the release of their platinum album To Hell with the Devil and brought Christian lyrics to their hard rock music style and glam metal looks. Two Pennsylvania bands, with Harrisburg's Poison and Philadelphia's Cinderella released multi-platinum début albums, respectively Look What the Cat Dragged In and Night Songs in 1986. Van Halen released 5150 their first album with Sammy Hagar on lead vocals, which was number one in the U.S. for three weeks and sold over six million copies. Additionally, some established hard rock and heavy metal bands of the era such as Scorpions, Whitesnake, Dio, Aerosmith, Kiss, Alice Cooper, Ozzy Osbourne, Judas Priest, Saxon and Accept began incorporating hair metal elements into their sounds and images, as the genre's popularity skyrocketed in 1985–1986.

Glam metal bands continued their run of commercial success in 1987 with Mötley Crüe releasing Girls, Girls, Girls, White Lion releasing Pride, and Def Leppard releasing Hysteria producing a hard rock record of seven hit singles. Another of the greatest successes of the era was Guns N' Roses, originally formed from a fusion of bands L.A. Guns and Hollywood Rose, who released the best-selling début of all time, Appetite for Destruction. With a "grittier" and "rawer" sound than most glam metal, incorporating elements punk and blues, Appetite For Destruction produced three top 10 hits, including the number one "Sweet Child O' Mine". Such was the dominance of the style that Californian hardcore punk band T.S.O.L. moved towards a glam metal sound in this period.

In the last years of the decade the most notable successes were New Jersey (1988) by Bon Jovi, OU812 (1988) by Van Halen, while Open Up and Say... Ahh! (1988) by Poison, spawned number one hit single "Every Rose Has Its Thorn", and eventually sold eight million copies worldwide. Britny Fox from Philadelphia and Winger from New York released their eponymous débuts in 1988. In 1989 Mötley Crüe produced their most commercially successful album, the multi-platinum number one Dr. Feelgood. In the same year eponymous débuts included Danger Danger from New York, Dangerous Toys from Austin, Texas, who provided more of a Southern rock tone to the genre, Enuff Z'Nuff from Chicago who provided an element of psychedelia to their sound and visual style, and Tora Tora from Memphis, Tennessee, who incorporated elements of blues rock into their music. L.A. débuts included Warrant with Dirty Rotten Filthy Stinking Rich (1989), and Skid Row with their eponymous album (1989), which reached number six in the Billboard 200, but they were to be one of the last major bands that emerged in the glam metal era.

Glam metal entered the 1990s as one of the major commercial genres of popular music, but such success would not continue for long; in 1990, débuts for Slaughter, from Las Vegas with Stick It to Ya and FireHouse, from North Carolina, with their eponymous album reached number 18 and number 21 on the Billboard 200 respectively, but it would be the peak of their commercial achievement. Y&T released their last album "Ten" before the band on went on hiatus a few years.

Decline (1991–1997)
The 1988 film The Decline of Western Civilization Part II: The Metal Years captured the Los Angeles scene of successful and aspiring bands. It also highlighted the excesses of glam metal, particularly the scene in which W.A.S.P. guitarist Chris Holmes was interviewed while drinking vodka on a floating chair in a swimming pool as his mother watched. As a result, it has been seen as helping to create a backlash against the genre. In the early 1990s glam metal's popularity rapidly declined after nearly a decade of success. Successful bands lost members that were key to their songwriting and/or live performances, such as Mötley Crue's frontman Vince Neil, Poison guitarist C.C. DeVille, Def Leppard guitarist Steve Clark and Guns N' Roses guitarist Izzy Stradlin. Several music writers and musicians began to deride glam metal acts as "hair farmers", hinting at the soon-to-be-popularized term "hair metal". Another reason for the decline in popularity of the style may have been the declining popularity of the power ballad. While its use, especially after a hard-rocking anthem, was initially a successful formula, in the early 1990s audiences lost interest in this approach.

One significant factor in the decline was the rise of grunge music from Seattle, with bands including Nirvana, Alice in Chains, Pearl Jam and Soundgarden. This was particularly obvious after the success of Nirvana's Nevermind (1991), which combined elements of hardcore punk and heavy metal into a dirty sound that made use of heavy guitar distortion, fuzz and feedback, along with darker lyrical themes, a stripped-down aesthetic and a complete rejection of the glam metal visual style and performance. Many major labels felt they had been caught off-guard by the surprise success of grunge and began turning over their personnel in favor of younger staffers more versed in the new scene. As MTV shifted its attention to the new style, glam metal bands found themselves relegated increasingly to late night airplay, and Headbangers Ball was cancelled at the end of 1994, while KNAC went over to Spanish programming. Given glam metal's lack of a major format presence on radio, bands were left without a clear way to reach their audience. Other (earlier Hollywood) alternative rock bands like the Red Hot Chili Peppers and Jane's Addiction also helped supplant the popularity of the genre.

Some artists tried to alter their sound, while others struggled on with their original format. In 1995, Van Halen released Balance, a multi-platinum seller that would be the band's last with Sammy Hagar on vocals. In 1996, David Lee Roth returned briefly and his replacement, former Extreme singer Gary Cherone, left the band soon after the release of the commercially unsuccessful 1998 album Van Halen III. Van Halen would not tour or record again until 2004. Welsh rock band Manic Street Preachers' 1992 debut album Generation Terrorists featured a glam metal sound. The album reached No. 1 in the UK Rock Chart, but failed to chart in the United States.

Meanwhile, Guns N' Roses' classic-lineup was whittled away throughout the decade. Drummer Steven Adler was fired in 1990, guitarist Izzy Stradlin left in late 1991 after recording Use Your Illusion I and II with the band. Tensions between the other band members and lead singer Axl Rose continued after the release of the 1993 punk rock covers album "The Spaghetti Incident?". Guitarist Slash left in 1996, followed by bassist Duff McKagan in 1998. Axl Rose, the only remaining member from the classic lineup at that point, worked with several lineups of the band to record Chinese Democracy – an album that would take over ten years to complete.

Revivals and nostalgia festivals (1997–present)

During the late 1990s and 2000s, glam metal began to have a revival. Some established acts who had managed to weather the storm enjoyed renewed popularity, others reformed and new bands emerged to emulate the glam metal style. Bon Jovi were still able to achieve a commercial hit with "It's My Life" (2000). They branched into country music with a version of their 2005 song "Who Says You Can't Go Home", which reached No. 1 on the Hot Country Singles chart in 2006 and the rock/country album Lost Highway which reached No. 1 in 2007. In 2009, Bon Jovi released The Circle, which marked a return to their hard rock sound and reached No. 1 on the Billboard 200. Mötley Crüe reunited with Vince Neil to record the 1997 album Generation Swine and Poison reunited with guitarist C.C. DeVille in 1999, producing the mostly live Power to the People (2000); both bands began to tour extensively. There were reunions and subsequent tours from Van Halen (with Hagar in 2004 and then Roth in 2007). The long-awaited Guns N' Roses album Chinese Democracy was finally released in 2008, but only went platinum in the US, produced no hit singles, and failed to come close to the success of the band's late 1980s and early 1990s material. Europe's "Final Countdown" enjoyed a new lease of popularity as the millennium drew to a close and the band reformed. Other acts to reform included Ratt, Britny Fox, Stryper (annually), and Skid Row.

Beginning in 1999, Monster Ballads, a series of compilation albums that feature popular power ballads, usually from the glam metal genre, capitalized on the nostalgia, with the first volume going platinum. The VH1 sponsored Rock Never Stops Tour, beginning in 1998, has seen many glam metal bands take to the stage again, including on the inaugural tour: Warrant, Slaughter, Quiet Riot, FireHouse, and L.A. Guns. Slaughter also took part in the 1999 version with Ted Nugent, Night Ranger, and Quiet Riot. Poison and Cinderella toured together in 2000 and 2002, and in 2005 Cinderella headlined the Rock Never Stops Tour, with support from Ratt, Quiet Riot, and FireHouse. In 2007 the four-day-long Rocklahoma festival held in Oklahoma included glam metal bands Poison, Ratt and Twisted Sister. Warrant and Cinderella co-headlined the festival in 2008. Nostalgia for the genre was evidenced in the production of the glam metal themed musical Rock of Ages, which ran in Los Angeles in 2006 and in New York in 2008. It was made into a film released in 2012.

Glam metal experienced a partial resurgence around the turn of the century, due in part to increased interest on the Internet, with the successful Glam Slam Metal Jam music festival taking place in the summer of 2000. By the early 2000s, a handful of new bands began to revive glam metal in one form or another. The Darkness's Permission to Land (2003), described as an "eerily realistic simulation of '80s metal and '70s glam", topped the UK charts, going quintuple platinum. One Way Ticket to Hell... and Back (2005) reached number 11. The band broke up in 2006, but reunited in 2011, releasing the album Hot Cakes the following year. Los Angeles band Steel Panther managed to gain a following by playing 1980s style glam metal. In Sweden the "sleaze metal" movement attempted to revive the genre, with bands including Vains of Jenna, Crashdïet and H.E.A.T, as well as the Finnish band Reckless Love. Other new acts included Beautiful Creatures and Buckcherry. The latter's breakthrough album 15 (2006) went platinum in the U.S. and spawned the single "Sorry" (2007), which made the top 10 of the Billboard Hot 100. In France, the band BlackRain also managed to get some coverage, thanks to their work with legendary producer Jack Douglas. Bands known for their metalcore background such as Black Veil Brides and Blessed by a Broken Heart have changed their style to be glam metal inspired, both musically and visually, with Black Veil Brides adding a gothic spin to the traditional glam image.

See also
List of glam metal albums and songs
List of glam metal bands and artists

Citations

Works cited

General bibliography 
 Auslander, P., Performing Glam Rock: Gender and Theatricality in Popular Music (Ann Arbor, MI: University of Michigan Press, 2006), .
 Batchelor, R.,  and Stoddart, S., The 1980s (London: Greenwood Publishing Group, 2007), .
 Bogdanov, V., Woodstra, C., and Erlewine, S. T., All Music Guide to Rock: The Definitive Guide to Rock, Pop, and Soul (Milwaukee, WI: Backbeat Books, 3rd edn., 2002), .
 Bukszpan, D., The Encyclopedia of Heavy Metal (London: Barnes & Noble Publishing, 2003), .
 Chapman, A., and Silber, L., Rock to Riches: Build Your Business the Rock & Roll Way (Capital Books, 2008), .
 Danville, E., and Mott, C., The Official Heavy Metal Book of Lists (Fayetteville, AR: University of Arkansas Press, 2009), .
 Davis, S., Watch You Bleed: The Saga of Guns N' Roses (New York: Gotham Books, 2008), .
 Hurd, M. G., Women Directors and their Films (London: Greenwood Publishing Group, 2007), .
 Macdonald, B., Harrington, J.,  and Dimery, R., Albums You Must Hear Before You Die (London: Quintet, 2006), .
 Moore, R., Sells Like Teen Spirit: Music, Youth Culture, and Social Crisis (New York: New York University Press, 2009), .
 Nicholls, D., The Cambridge History of American Music (Cambridge: Cambridge University Press, 1998), .
 Smith, C., 101 Albums that Changed Popular Music (Oxford: Oxford University Press, 2009), .
 Walser, R., Running with the Devil: Power, Gender, and Madness in Heavy Metal Music (Middletown, CT: Wesleyan University Press, 1993), .
 Weinstein, D., Heavy Metal: The Music and Its Culture (Cambridge, MA: Da Capo Press, 2000), .
 Weinstein, D., "Rock critics need bad music", in C. Washburne and M. Derno, eds, Bad Music: the Music we Love to Hate (London: Routledge, 2004), .
 Yfantis, V., "Power Ballads And The Stories Behind", (Athens: CreateSpace Independent Publishing Platform, 2021), .

 
1980s fads and trends
1980s in music
1990s in music
20th-century music genres
Heavy metal genres
Fusion music genres